Center 66, developed by Hang Lung Properties, is located in Chong'an District, the central business district of Wuxi, close to the junction of Zhongshan Lu and Renmin Zhong Lu, the city's two busiest commercial streets.  It is a mixed-use development consists of office and retail. The retail component was opened in late 2013.

The project includes the preserved cluster of historical buildings from the Ming Dynasty known as the Chenghuang Temple Precinct at the heart of a large public plaza within the development.

References

Skyscrapers in Wuxi
Aedas buildings
2014 establishments in China
Office buildings completed in 2014